Olga Prokuronova (born 3 July 1989) is a Russian former pair skater. Prokuronova competed with Czech skater Karel Štefl and won the 2006 Czech senior national title. They placed 10th in the short program at the 2006 European Championships in Lyon, France, but suffered a fall on a lift in the free skate. Prokuronova lay on the ice for several seconds before Štefl helped her to her feet and she exited the ice. They withdrew from the event. An ISU doctor said Prokuronova had not sustained a serious injury but was taken to the hospital for further examination. In October 2006, it was reported that she had declined to resume the partnership.

Programs 
(with Štefl)

Competitive highlights 
(with Štefl)

(with Goncharov)

References

External links 
 
 Olga Prokuronova / Alexander Goncharov at fskate.ru

Russian female pair skaters
1989 births
Living people
Figure skaters from Moscow